Francisco Javier Chahuán Chahuán (born 20 May 1971) is a Chilean politician and lawyer. He is the current president of the centre-right party Renovación Nacional.

Controversies
During a constitutional reform project discussion about regulating the financing and propaganda of August 2020's constituent plebiscite campaigns, Chahuán appeared online via Zoom Video when he was driving in his car, which he tried to hide with an office wallpaper.

Works
 Solidaridad ahora (1988)
 Testamento de simples palabras (1992)
 La solidaridad como fundamento de los derechos en el marco del régimen democrático (1996)
 Navegando hacia mi padre y al encuentro del hijo (2001)
 La palabra de Dios no tiene idiomas (2015)
 Semillas de futuro. Voces para el Chile 2030 (2015)
 Modernización del Ministerio de Relaciones Exteriores: un paso necesario (2017)
 Pequeñas letras (2017)
 Diagnóstico político para la acción (2017)
 Lineamientos Estratégicos sobre Política Nacional de Puertos (2018)

In co-autory with Jorge Salomó
 Gustavo Lorca Rojas, Hombre de bien, ejemplo de buena política (2016)

In co-autory with Francisco Sánchez and Diego Piedra
 1978: Tempestad en el Beagle (2018)

References

External links
 

1971 births
Living people
20th-century Chilean lawyers
Chilean people of Arab descent
People from Viña del Mar
University of Valparaíso alumni
21st-century Chilean politicians
National Renewal (Chile) politicians
Senators of the LV Legislative Period of the National Congress of Chile
Senators of the LVI Legislative Period of the National Congress of Chile